1928 in sports describes the year's events in world sport.

American football
 NFL championship – Providence Steam Roller (8–1–2)
 USC Trojans – college football national championship shared with Georgia Tech Yellow Jackets

Association football
England
 The Football League – Everton 53 points, Huddersfield Town 51, Leicester City 48, Derby County 44, Bury 44, Cardiff City 44
 FA Cup final – Blackburn Rovers 3–1 Huddersfield Town at Empire Stadium, Wembley, London
Germany
 National Championship – Hamburger SV 5–2 Hertha BSC at Hamburg-Altona

Australian rules football
VFL Premiership
 Collingwood wins the 32nd VFL Premiership: Collingwood 13.18 (96) d Richmond 9.9 (63) at Melbourne Cricket Ground (MCG)
Brownlow Medal
 The annual Brownlow Medal is awarded to Ivor Warne-Smith (Melbourne)

Bandy
Sweden
 Championship final – IF Göta 5-3 IK Sirius

Baseball
World Series
 4–9 October — New York Yankees (AL) defeats St. Louis Cardinals (NL) to win the 1928 World Series by 4 games to 0

Basketball
ABL Championship

New York Celtics win three games to one over the Fort Wayne Hoosiers

Bobsleigh
Olympic Games (Men's Competition)
 A 5-man bob event is held at the 1928 Winter Olympics in St Moritz.  
 The gold medal is won by USA II ahead of USA I (silver) and Germany II (bronze).

Boxing
Events
 26 July — Gene Tunney's final fight is a 12th-round technical knockout of Tom Heeney in the Bronx; the World Heavyweight Championship becomes vacant until 1930
Lineal world champions
 World Heavyweight Championship – Gene Tunney → vacant
 World Light Heavyweight Championship – Tommy Loughran
 World Middleweight Championship – Mickey Walker
 World Welterweight Championship – Joe Dundee
 World Lightweight Championship – Sammy Mandell
 World Featherweight Championship – vacant → Tony Canzoneri → Andre Routis
 World Bantamweight Championship – vacant
 World Flyweight Championship – vacant

Canadian football
Grey Cup
 16th Grey Cup – Hamilton Tigers 30–0 Regina Roughriders

Cricket
Events
 The Board of Control for Cricket in India (BCCI) is inaugurated.
 The West Indian team touring England in the 1928 season is the first to play Test cricket but is not very successful, losing all three Tests by an innings and winning only five out of 30 first-class matches.
England
 County Championship – Lancashire
 Minor Counties Championship – Berkshire
 Most runs – Frank Woolley 3352 @ 60.94 (HS 198)
 Most wickets – Tich Freeman 304 @ 18.05 (BB 9–104)
 Wisden Cricketers of the Year – Leslie Ames, George Duckworth, Maurice Leyland, Sam Staples, Jack White
Australia
 Sheffield Shield – Victoria
 Most runs – Bill Ponsford 1217 @ 152.12 (HS 437)
 Most wickets – Clarrie Grimmett 42 @ 27.40 (BB 8–57)
India
 Bombay Quadrangular – Europeans
New Zealand
 Plunket Shield – Wellington
South Africa
 Currie Cup – not contested
West Indies
 Inter-Colonial Tournament – Trinidad and Tobago

Cycling
Tour de France
 Nicolas Frantz (Luxembourg) wins the 22nd Tour de France

Field hockey
Olympic Games (Men's Competition)
 Gold Medal – India
 Silver Medal – Netherlands
 Bronze Medal – Germany

Figure skating
World Figure Skating Championships
 World Women's Champion – Sonja Henie (Norway)
 World Men's Champion – Willi Böckel (Austria)
 World Pairs Champions – Andreé Joly-Brunet and Pierre Brunet (France)

Golf
Major tournaments
 British Open – Walter Hagen
 US Open – Johnny Farrell
 USPGA Championship – Leo Diegel
Other tournaments
 British Amateur – Philip Perkins
 US Amateur – Bobby Jones

Horse racing
England
 Champion Hurdle –Brown Jack
 Cheltenham Gold Cup – Patron Saint
 Grand National – Tipperary Tim
 1,000 Guineas Stakes – Scuttle
 2,000 Guineas Stakes – Flamingo
 The Derby – Felstead
 The Oaks – Toboggan
 St. Leger Stakes – Fairway
Australia
 Melbourne Cup – Statesman
Canada
 King's Plate – Young Kitty
France
 Prix de l'Arc de Triomphe – Kantar
Ireland
 Irish Grand National – Don Sancho
 Irish Derby Stakes – Baytown
USA
 Kentucky Derby – Reigh Count
 Preakness Stakes – Victorian
 Belmont Stakes – Vito

Ice hockey
Stanley Cup
 5–14 April — New York Rangers defeats Montreal Maroons in the 1928 Stanley Cup Finals by 3 games to 2

Motorsport

Nordic skiing
Olympic Games (Men's Competition)
 Cross-country skiing (18 km) – gold medal: Johan Grøttumsbråten (Norway)
 Cross-country skiing (50 km) – gold medal: Per-Erik Hedlund (Sweden)
 Ski jumping – gold medal: Alf Andersen (Norway)
 Nordic combined – gold medal: Johan Grøttumsbråten (Norway)

Olympic Games
1928 Winter Olympics
 The 1928 Winter Olympics takes place at St Moritz in Switzerland (February 11 - February 19)
 Norway wins the most medals (15) and the most gold medals (6)
1928 Summer Olympics
 The 1928 Summer Olympics takes place at Amsterdam (July 28 - August 12)
 United States wins the most medals (56) and the most gold medals (22)

Radiosport
Events
 First ever organised radio contest is held: the ARRL International Relay Party, sponsored by the American Radio Relay League

Rowing
The Boat Race
 28 March — Cambridge wins the 80th Oxford and Cambridge Boat Race

Rugby league
England
 Championship – Swinton
 Challenge Cup final – Swinton 5–3 Warrington at Central Park, Wigan 
 Lancashire League Championship – Swinton
 Yorkshire League Championship – Leeds
 Lancashire County Cup – Swinton 5–2 Wigan
 Yorkshire County Cup – Dewsbury 8–2 Hull
Australia
 NSW Premiership – South Sydney 26–5 Eastern Suburbs (grand final)

Rugby union
Five Nations Championship
 41st Five Nations Championship series is won by England who complete the Grand Slam

Snooker
World Championship
 2nd World Snooker Championship is won by Joe Davis who defeats Fred Lawrence 16–13

Speed skating
Speed Skating World Championships
 Men's All-round Champion – Clas Thunberg (Finland)
1928 Winter Olympics
 500m – gold medal: Bernt Evensen (Norway)
 1500m – gold medal: Clas Thunberg (Finland)
 5000m – gold medal: Ivar Ballangrud (Norway)
 10000m – cancelled due to thawing ice
 All-round – removed from program

Tennis
Australia
 Australian Men's Singles Championship – Jean Borotra (France) defeats Jack Cummings (Australia) 6–4 6–1 4–6 5–7 6–3
 Australian Women's Singles Championship – Daphne Akhurst Cozens (Australia) defeats Esna Boyd Robertson (Australia) 7–5 6–2
England
 Wimbledon Men's Singles Championship – René Lacoste (France) defeats Henri Cochet (France) 6–1 4–6 6–4 6–2
 Wimbledon Women's Singles Championship – Helen Wills Moody (USA) defeats Lilí de Álvarez (Spain) 6–2 6–3
France
 French Men's Singles Championship – Henri Cochet (France) defeats René Lacoste (France) 5–7 6–3 6–1 6–3
 French Women's Singles Championship – Helen Wills Moody (USA) defeats Eileen Bennett Whittingstall (Great Britain) 6–1 6–2
USA
 American Men's Singles Championship – Henri Cochet (France) defeats Francis Hunter (USA) 4–6 6–4 3–6 7–5 6–3
 American Women's Singles Championship – Helen Wills Moody (USA) defeats Helen Jacobs (USA) 6–2 6–1
Davis Cup
 1928 International Lawn Tennis Challenge –  4–1  at Stade Roland Garros (clay) Paris, France

References

 
Sports by year